, also known as Terror in Tokyo, is a Japanese anime television series produced by MAPPA. The anime was created and directed by Shinichirō Watanabe, with character designs by Kazuto Nakazawa and music by Yoko Kanno. The anime began airing on Fuji TV's Noitamina block from July to September 2014. It consisted of 11 episodes.

Plot
In an alternative iteration of the present, two teenage boys who go by the names Nine and Twelve steal a prototype atomic bomb in an apparent terrorist attack. Calling themselves , they upload a video onto the Internet and threaten to destroy Tokyo unless a cryptic riddle can be solved. They are two of the survivors of a secret experiment by the Rising Peace Academy to develop orphaned children with savant syndrome into human weapons. They befriend Lisa, a lonely high school girl, who becomes caught up in their plans to expose the nefarious activities of the organization.

Characters

Main characters
 / 
 
A secretive young man with a bright mind and calm demeanor, who moves to Tokyo and attends high school alongside Twelve under the name Arata Kokonoe. He is one of the masterminds behind Sphinx. He and Twelve are survivors of a secret experiment by the Rising Peace Academy to develop 26 highly intelligent orphaned children into human weapons.

 / 
 
An apparently childish young man who is the second member of Sphinx. He is kind and caring, and befriends the lonely schoolgirl, Lisa. He uses the civilian identity of Tōji Hisami and is skilled at operating vehicles like motorbikes and snowmobiles. Twelve has synesthesia; that allows him to see sound as color.

 
A high school girl with a problematic life both at home and school. She is befriended by Nine and Twelve who save her from bullies at her school and she becomes caught up in their plans.

 
A detective of the Tokyo Metropolitan Police Department who used to be an ace of the police force's investigations division, but was demoted to its records division after continuing an unauthorized investigation. He is highly intelligent and is called back into the force to investigate the terrorist group Sphinx.

 
She is the third survivor of the Rising Peace Academy experiment, highly competitive and has a love-hate relationship with Nine because of his talent. She becomes an American FBI operative who travels to Japan as part of her duties with NEST to lend support to the terrorist attack investigations. Her obsession with Nine exposes her willingness to endanger, or even kill, innocent people to get close to Nine and Twelve.

Supporting characters

The chief of the Tokyo Metropolitan Police Department station, who heads the investigation into Nine and Twelve's bomb threats.

A passionate, young police officer who collaborates with Shibazaki even after he is suspended.

Shibazaki's co-worker from the records division who helps him solve Sphinx's riddles.

The head of Shibazaki's team and later the chief.

A scientist working to identify the bombing techniques used by Sphinx.

Clarence

Five's partner and an FBI agent.

Lisa's mother, who is highly paranoid and extremely possessive of Lisa due to her husband leaving the family home.

Shibazaki's daughter who is studying particles.
Mamiya

The creator of the Athena Project.

Release
The anime was created and directed by Shinichirō Watanabe, with character designs by Kazuto Nakazawa and music by Yoko Kanno. The anime began airing on Fuji TV's Noitamina block on July 10, 2014, and its final episode aired on September 25, 2014. In total, it was made up of 11 episodes. Funimation acquired North American streaming rights and released an English dub on DVD on January 19, 2016. Anime Limited and Madman Entertainment acquired streaming rights for the UK and Australia, respectively. Funimation premiered the series at Anime Expo on July 5, 2014.

List of episodes

Soundtrack

The series' soundtrack is composed by Yoko Kanno. The opening theme song is "Trigger", composed by Kanno and performed by former Galileo Galilei vocalist Yuuki Ozaki. "Terror in Resonance Original Soundtrack 2 -crystalized-" was released on October 22, 2014. The cover artwork is designed by Ingibjörg Birgisdóttir.

Director Shinichirō Watanabe stated in interview with Otaku USA Magazine that the music of Icelandic band Sigur Rós was the inspiration for the show and its soundtrack.

Reception

Accolades
Terror in Resonance was awarded Anime of the Year, Best Original Anime of the Year and Mystery or Psychological Anime of the Year in the 1st Anime Trending Awards in 2014. The series has won the French award "Daruma d'or anime" at the Japan Expo Awards 2016. It was part of the Jury Selections of the 18th Japan Media Arts Festival in the Animation category in 2014.

Critical response
Nick Creamer of Anime News Network gave the anime an A, and describes the series as "The direction is basically flawless, and the semi-realistic art design keeps the show grounded while also offering consistent moments of larger-than-life beauty. Overall, Terror in Resonance is just short of a masterpiece, only held back by the weaknesses of its overt thriller dramatics. When it comes to ideas and execution, the show is absolutely bulletproof, a gorgeous and cutting meditation on the contradictory complexities of modern society. Its characters rage at a system that no one truly wants, caught up in cycles the show frames as tragically inevitable. In the context of its well-earned cynicism, its few moments of honest human connection feel all the more precious, brought home by expert framing and brilliant use of music. The show certainly has its moments of frustration, but few anime get better than this. A rich and passionate meditation on modern society that is elevated by some of the finest music and visuals in anime".

China ban
In 2015, the Chinese Ministry of Culture listed Terror in Resonance among 38 anime and manga titles banned in China. Officials stated that the aforementioned series "include scenes of violence, pornography, terrorism and crimes against public morality" that could potentially incite minors to commit such acts as reasons for the ban.

References

External links
 

2014 anime television series debuts
Fiction set in 2014
2014 Japanese television series endings
Abandoned buildings and structures in fiction
Anime with original screenplays
Aniplex franchises
Funimation
Fiction about government
Experimental medical treatments in fiction
Laboratories in fiction
MAPPA
Martyrdom in fiction
Noitamina
Orphans in fiction
Propaganda in fiction
Psychological thriller anime and manga
Suicide in television
Television series about nuclear war and weapons
Television shows about death games
Terrorism in television
Theft in fiction
World War II television series
Censored television series
Works banned in China
Television censorship in China
Alternate history anime and manga